The Williamsburg Formation is a geologic formation in South Carolina consisting of sandy shale and clayey sand. It is a member of the Black Mingo Group and overlays the Rhems Formation. It preserves fossils, among others coprolites, dating back to the Paleogene period.

Fossil content 
The following fossils were reported from the formation:

Mammals 
 Ectoganus gliriformis
 E. lobdelli
 Mingotherium holtae

Reptiles 
 Agomphus pectoralis
 A. aff. alabamensis
 Osteopygis emarginatus
 Trionyx virginiana
 Adocus sp.
 ?Bothremys sp.
 Chelonioidea indet.
 Cheloniidae indet.
 Pelomedusoides indet.
 Taphrosphyini indet.
 Toxochelyinae indet.

Crocodylians
 Bottosaurus sp.
 Hyposaurus sp.
 Thoracosaurus sp.
 Eusuchia indet.

Snakes
 Palaeophis sp.

See also 
 List of fossiliferous stratigraphic units in South Carolina
 Paleontology in South Carolina

References

Bibliography 

 
 
 
 

Paleogene geology of South Carolina
Paleocene Series of North America
Thanetian Stage
Clarkforkian
Shale formations
Sandstone formations
Phosphorite formations
Shallow marine deposits
Fossiliferous stratigraphic units of North America
Paleontology in South Carolina